Allan Edge is a British former slalom canoeist who competed in the 1970s.

He won a gold medal in the K-1 team event at the 1979 ICF Canoe Slalom World Championships in Jonquière.

References
Overview of athlete's results at canoeslalom.net

British male canoeists
Possibly living people
Year of birth missing (living people)
Place of birth missing (living people)
Medalists at the ICF Canoe Slalom World Championships